Elise Vanderelst (born 27 January 1998) is a Belgian middle-distance runner. She won the gold medal for the 1500 metres at the 2021 European Indoor Championships. Vanderelst represented Belgium at the 2020 Tokyo Olympics, competing in the 1500 m event.

She holds Belgian national records in the 1000 metres and indoor & outdoor 1500m. Vanderelst won multiple national titles.

Achievements

International competitions

Personal bests

Notes

References

External links

 
 
 

1998 births
Living people
Belgian female middle-distance runners
Place of birth missing (living people)
European Athletics Indoor Championships winners
Athletes (track and field) at the 2020 Summer Olympics
Olympic athletes of Belgium
21st-century Belgian women
Sportspeople from Mons